The 1985 Winnipeg Blue Bombers finished in 2nd place in the West Division with a 12–4 record. They faced the BC Lions in the West Final for the third straight year. Despite winning both regular season meetings against the Lions, they lost the game 42–22, ending their hopes of repeating as Grey Cup champions.

Offseason

CFL Draft

Preseason

Regular season

Standings

Schedule

Playoffs

West Semi-Final

West Final

Awards

1985 CFL All-Stars

References

Winnipeg Blue Bombers seasons
1985 Canadian Football League season by team